The 2013 IPC Swimming World Championships was an international swimming competition, the biggest meet for athletes with a disability since the 2012 Summer Paralympics. It was held in Montreal, Quebec, Canada and lasted from 12 to 18 August. Around 530 athletes competed from 57 different countries. The event was held in the Parc Jean Drapeau Aquatic Complex located at the Parc Jean-Drapeau in Montreal. 172 events were contested with 43 new world records set.

Venue

The Championship was staged at the Parc Jean Drapeau Aquatic Complex in the Parc Jean-Drapeau located in the east of Montreal. The complex contains three outdoor swimming pools, all renovated shortly before the staging of the competition.

Coverage
As with the 2013 IPC Athletics World Championships, the IPC will continue to show live streaming of the evening finals on ParalympicSport.TV. In the United Kingdom Channel 4 continued their commitment to parasport with their own live streaming Paralympics website with pool-side commentary and a daily one-hour highlights television show the following morning on Channel 4. In Brazil coverage was provided by Globo-Sport TV while some European Broadcasting Union countries would also air the championships.

Events

Classification

Athletes are allocated a classification for each event based upon their disability to allow fairer competition between athletes of similar ability. The classifications for swimming are:
Visual impairment
S11-S13
Intellectual impairment
S14
Other disability
S1-S10 (Freestyle, backstroke and butterfly)
SB1-SB9 (breaststroke)
SM1-SM10 (individual medley)
Classifications run from S1 (severely disabled) to S10 (minimally disabled) for athletes with physical disabilities, and S11 (totally blind) to S13 (legally blind) for visually impaired athletes. Blind athletes must use blackened goggles.

Schedule

Medal table 
The medal table at the end of the championship.

Multiple medallists
Many competitors won multiple medals at the 2013 Championships. The following athletes won five gold medals or more.

Highlights

Day 1 (12 August)
The first medal of the 2013 World Championships was won by Ireland's Darragh McDonald who took gold in the 400m freestyle S6 class. The first world record of the games came much earlier in the day when at 9:18AM on only the fourth heat of the championships, Konstantin Lisenkov of Russia recorded a time of 1:04.12 to beat his own record set three years earlier in Eindhoven in the 100m backstroke S8. This was one of three world records to fall in the morning heats, the others going to Nely Miranda Herrera (Mexico) in the 50m Women's freestyle S4 and Olga Sviderska (Ukraine) in the Women's 200m freestyle S3.

The afternoon session witnessed five new world records. Ihar Boki of Belarus, one of the stand-out athletes of the championships, broke the world record in the final of the SM13 200m individual medley. Then within the hour two more records fell as Lisenkov's record in the 100m backstroke S8, set in the morning, failed to last a day as he took 0.70 seconds of his own time to secure gold; while Britain's Josef Craig added the World title of the 400m freestyle S7 to his Paralympic title with a winning time of 4:39.13. The final two new world records were set in the last three races of the day. New Zealand's Sophie Pascoe swam 1:00.15 in the 100m freestyle S10 while British athlete Jessica-Jane Applegate recorded a time of 2:09.88 in the 200m freestyle to just freeze out Ireland's Bethany Firth.

Of the other medals, several of the big stars of the games took their first gold medals on the first day. Ukraine's Dmytro Vynohradets took the first of his seven gold medals with success in the Men's 200m freestyle S3, while his teammate Olga Sviderska took the equivalent title in the women's race but well outside her morning's record finish. Australia's Matthew Cowdrey picked up the first of five championship golds in the 100m freestyle S9 while the women's race Stephanie Millward of Britain secured the first of her four golds. New Zealand saw further success on Day one when Mary Fisher started her rung of gold medals with a win in the 100m backstroke S11. Brazil's Andre Brasil became a double Paralympic and World Champion taking the 100m Freestyle S10, a title he has held in those two world championships since 2008 in Beijing. The USA also achieved success on day one, collecting three medals from Roy Perkins (50m butterfly S5), Rebecca Anne Meyers (200m medley SM13) and Cortney Jordan (400m freestyle S7), though it was the Ukraine who topped the medal table at the day with six golds.

Participating nations
Below is the list of countries who agreed to participate in the Championships and the requested number of athlete places for each.
 (11)
 (1)
 (20)
 (1)
 (3)
 (3)
 (29)
 (28)
 ( 1)
 (21)
 (1)
 (10) 
 (3)
 (1)
 (8)
 (4)
 (2)
 (2)
 (7)
 (1)
 (12)
 (35)
 (12)
 (3)
 (18)
 (4)
 (1)
 (1)
 (7)
 (7)
 (19)
 (13)
 (2)
 (1)
 (2)
 (1)
 (14)
 (2)
 (12)
 (7)
 (4)
 (7)
 (6)
 (2)
 (46)
 (2)
 (3)
 (3)
 (11)
 (5)
 (20)
 (6) 
 (1)
 (52)
 (1)
 (30) 
 (1)

Footnotes
Notes

References

External links
 Official web-site

 
World Para Swimming Championships
Sports competitions in Montreal
International aquatics competitions hosted by Canada
Swimming competitions in Canada
IPC Swimming World Championships
IPC Swimming World Championships
August 2013 sports events in Canada
2010s in Montreal
2013 in Quebec